is a term used widely in the English-speaking world to refer to any kind of rock music featuring Spanish vocals. Compared to English-speaking bands, very few acts reached worldwide success or between Spanish-speaking countries due to a lack of promotion. Despite rock en españols origins in the late 1950s, many rock acts achieved at best nationwide fame until the Internet consolidated the listeners. However, some rock en español artists did become internationally popular with the help of a promotional campaign from the mid-1980s to the mid-1990s called "" ("Rock in your language"). Some specific rock-based styles influenced by folkloric rhythms have also developed in these regions. Some of the more prominent styles are Latin rock (a fusion of rock music with Latin American and Caribbean folkloric sounds developed in Latino communities); Latin alternative, an alternative rock scene that blended a Latin sound with other genres like Caribbean ska, reggae, and soca; or Andalusian rock, a flamenco-influenced style that emerged in Spain.

History

Beginnings (1956–1964)

Spanish-speaking rock music began in the late-1950s, through listening to Black American rock artists in the United States at the time. The song "El relojito" by Gloria Ríos released in 1956 is often considered the blueprint of rock en español. In 1958, Ritchie Valens covered the Mexican folk song "La Bamba", popularizing Spanish-language rock music throughout Latin America. That year, Daniel Flores composed "Tequila" and The Champs production of the song, which reached nº1 in Billboard pop charts. 

The new sound immediately caught the attention of the middle and upper class. The first rock bands in Latin America were created in the late 1950s with Los Llopis and Los Teen Tops achieving some success covering American rock classics during the early 1960s. The Spanish scene received some influences of non-English-speaking countries with the Yé-yé style as could be seen with Raphael. In the early 1960s, those styles of commercial rock music were nicknamed Nueva ola (New wave) in some South American countries to refer the bands that adopted the American and European styles.

British invasion effect (1964–1970)

After the popularization of The Beatles and the world success of the British Invasion, the Hispanophone world adapted new styles like Beat music, rhythm and blues, psychedelia, soul, folk-rock and pop music. The Beatles and other British beat groups and American rock bands were greatly influenced by AfroAmerican musicians such as Chuck Berry, Little Richard, Stax Records musicians and Motown musicians.

The influences of beat music and psychedelic pop were noticeable in some acts such as Los Brincos, El Kinto, Los Gatos or The Speakers, while other successful bands featured mostly English and few Spanish vocals like Los Bravos or Los Shakers. Success outside of the native and Spanish-speaking scene proved difficult to attain though, and the few hits these bands achieved worldwide were sung in English, as Miguel Ríos and Los Bravos did for example. Los Saicos were one of the very oldest proto-punk bands in the world.

By mid-decade the Mexican (later US citizen) Carlos Santana moved north to California and soon joined the burgeoning San Francisco rock scene. Forming the band Santana towards the end of the sixties, he would gather a shifting group of musicians from mixed Anglo-Saxon and Hispanic backgrounds; the band would become one of the more popular acts of the 1970s in the U.S., Mexico, and Europe and brought together elements of rock, blues and jazz with Latin percussion and harmonics (as evidenced, for example, on Santana (1969), Abraxas (1970) and Santana III (1971)). The band would consistently alternate lyrics in Spanish and English; they were arguably the most successful crossover Latin/Anglo rock band to date, and were important in spreading interest in Latin percussion and drumming around the world.
 
Although he is not a rock en español musician, Carlos Santana's background is that of a traditional Latin musician who has fused rock guitar (and jazz and salsa rhythms) with classic Latin American songs and a sizeable body of compositions by himself and his band. Their hit song "Oye Como Va" is an example of Santana's latin rock version, being originally composed by famous Latin jazz and mambo musician Tito Puente. From the late 1960s on, concurrently with the success of Santana, there was a growing interest in Latin-American folk music and dancing as well as a worldwide cultural boom for Latin-American literature and its colourful, sometimes surrealist and magic realist storytelling, which sustained an interest in Latin music in general, though not always in Latin rock music as such. There was a noticeable Latin influence in 1970s jazz (e.g. Herbie Hancock, Return to Forever) and some acts like Malo, Sapo, El Chicano were performing Latin Rock during the same decade.

However, styles like blues, acid rock, hard rock, and prog rock would be very influential around the next decade. Almendra, led by Luis Alberto Spinetta, was one of the most important prog bands of the late 1960s and later, Spinetta would become one of the most important artists of the 1970s rock en español scene,

Prog rock domain, hard rock origins and Repression (1970-1979)

Influenced by the new trends of the 60's, psychedelic acts like Los Dug Dug's, Pescado Rabioso (heavy psych)— or La Revolución de Emiliano Zapata (although rarely they featured Spanish vocals during these years); blues acts like Manal and progressive rock bands like Invisible, Sui Generis (folk prog), Témpano, Los Jaivas (Andean rock), Vox Dei (which style would turn harder sounding) or Triana (heavily influenced by flamenco) and Crack (more British  prog-rock influenced) appeared. Triana were pioneers of the Andalusian rock scene, a new style which emerged in Spain that combined prog rock with flamenco.

The first hard rock acts appeared in the early 1970s with bands like Pappo's Blues. Also, a new hard rock movement influenced by prog, blues and punk called Spanish Rock urbano lead the harder scene of the late 1970s with bands like Leño.

But in these days appeared some repression of rock music in Mexico. The government forced artists, labels and radio stations to go "underground" as they associated the music with the breakdown of societal standards. The main pushing edge that created tension with the government was due to the Avándaro Rock Festival in 1971. Also the dictatorship established in Argentina in 1976 make some Argentine artist leave the country for greener pastures in Europe, mostly Spain. They joined the Spanish rock scene and sometimes Hispano-Argentine bands Tequila get formed and achieved success. Tequila joined a rock and roll, glam and rhythm & blues scene along with other Spanish acts Burning or La Orquesta Mondragón.

Internationalization (1980s)

The most prominent punk bands appeared along the 1980s with La Polla Records, Siniestro Total or Los Violadores. Subgenres derived from punk like New Wave and Post punk were also important during the 1980s. La Movida Madrileña was an important movement of these styles among others.
In the mid-1980s, a promotional campaign called "Rock en tu idioma" (Rock in your language) started helping to internationalize some bands. Soda Stereo is largely credited as the first Spanish-language rock band to gain widespread popularity across Latin America. However, there was equal transnational success in the late 1980s from Virus, Radio Futura, Enanitos Verdes, Caifanes, Hombres G, or Los Prisioneros among others during the same time period.

Though mainly a teen-pop band, Puerto Rican band Menudo at times also dabbled into Rock en Espanol during this decade; examples of their rock music work include their albums "Quiero Ser" (alternatively named "Rock Chiquillo" in some markets), "A Todo Rock" and "Hijos del Rock" as well as songs such as "Quiero Rock", "Rock en la TV", "Mi Banda Toca Rock", "Sube a mi Motora" and "Jovenes". Similarly, Los Chicos de Puerto Rico a band that was similar to Menudo, had a song named "Rock Solido" which was released during 1983.

Recent times (1990s onward)

The final amalgamation into a coherent international scene was helped by the introduction of MTV Latin America in 1993, where the first video shown, "We are sudamerican rockers" by Chilean band Los Prisioneros, reflected its aims to create a Latin American scene. In the late 1990s, MTV created the Latino Award in the MTV Video Music Awards and Premios MTV Latinoamérica in 2002, awards that recognize the talented bands and achievements of the genre. However, MTV Latin America was criticized for focusing primarily on rock bands from Argentina and Mexico, with the occasional band from Chile or Colombia.  For example, bands on MTV Latino that received very regular airplay were Soda Stereo, Los Fabulosos Cadillacs, Los Amigos Invisibles, Mano Negra, Café Tacuba, Los Tres, Aterciopelados, Maldita Vecindad, Babasónicos, Los Rodríguez and Héroes del Silencio. On the other hand, some hard rock bands like La Renga, Cuca or Extremoduro achieved success.

During the success of Alternative rock in the 1990s, many bands performed alt rock and Latin Alternative (style that combined alt rock with ska, reggae and Latin folkloric elements) like Robi Draco Rosa, Caifanes, Café Tacuba, and La Ley initiated a new stage of Latin rock by broadening its international appeal. Since then, successful bands and musicians include Juanes, Libido, Maná, Jaguares, Caramelos de Cianuro, Aterciopelados, Bersuit Vergarabat, Jorge Drexler and Los Tres among others. The new bands were able to be successful through the development of the music video in the 1990s.

Rock en español in the United States

Rock en español borrows heavily from rock and roll music and traditional and popular music of Spanish-speaking countries such as cumbia, ranchera, rumba, and tango. In its 50-year history, it has evolved from having a cult-like following to being a more well established music genre.

In Los Angeles, an underground scene has developed and continues to flourish that supports the local rock en español acts. Top bands from the LA REE scene include Los Invisibles of José L. Garza, Motita, Pastilla, Los Amigos Invisibles, Maria Fatal, Rascuache, Voz de Mano, Cabula, Satélite, Las 15 letras, Verdadera FE, Aaron Andreu and Los Olvidados.

Record labels that have supported US based REE include Aztlan records, El Mero Mero Records, and Mofo Records. Many of them have been associated to the Chicano rock scene.

Other variations
 Argentine rock
 Chilean rock
 Colombian rock
 Costa Rican rock
 Cuban rock
 Dominican rock
 Ecuadorian rock
 Guatemalan rock
 Mexican rock
 Panamanian rock
 Peruvian rock
 Puerto Rican rock
 Spanish rock
 Uruguayan rock

See also
 Brown-eyed soul
 Latin alternative
 Latin American music
 Flamenco rock
 Latin Grammy Award for Best Rock Album
 Tejano music
 La Movida Madrileña
 Rock en tu idioma
 Latino punk

References

Brill, Mark. Music of Latin America and the Caribbean, 2nd Edition, 2018. Taylor & Francis 

 
Spanish music
Spanish-language music